Amalric of Bena (died ) was a French theologian, philosopher and sect leader, after whom the Amalricians are named. Reformers such as Martin Luther considered him to be a proto-Protestant.

Biography
Amalric was born in the latter part of the 12th century at Bennes, a village between Ollé and Chauffours in the diocese of Chartres.

Amalric taught philosophy and theology at the University of Paris and enjoyed a great reputation as a subtle dialectician, his lectures developing the philosophy of Aristotle attracted a large audience.  In 1204 his doctrines were condemned by the university and, on a personal appeal to Pope Innocent III, the sentence was ratified, Amalric being ordered to return to Paris and recant his errors.

His death was caused, it is said, by grief at the humiliation to which he had been subjected.
In 1209, ten of his followers were burnt before the gates of Paris and Amalric's own body was exhumed and burnt and the ashes given to the winds.  The doctrines of his followers, known as the Amalricians, were formally condemned by the fourth Lateran Council in 1215.

Propositions
Amalric appears to have derived his philosophical system from a selective reading Eriugena, whose expressions he developed in a one-sided and strongly pantheistic form. 

Only three propositions can be attributed to him with certainty:
that God is all (omnia sunt deus) and thus all things are one because whatever is, is God (omnia unum, quia quidquid est, est Deus);
that every Christian is bound to believe that he is a member of the body of Christ, and that this belief is necessary for salvation;
that he who remains in love of God can commit no sin.

Because of the first proposition, God himself is thought to be invisible and only recognizable in his creation.

These three propositions were further developed by his followers, who maintained that God revealed Himself in a threefold revelation, the first in the Biblical patriarch Abraham, marking the epoch of the Father; the second in Jesus Christ, who began the epoch of the Son; and the third in Amalric and his disciples, who inaugurated the era of the Holy Ghost.

Amalricians taught:
Hell is ignorance, therefore Hell is within all men, "like a bad tooth in a mouth";
God is identical with all that is, even evil belongs to God and proves God's omnipotence;
A man who knows that God works through everything cannot sin, because every human act is then the act of God;
A man who recognizes the truth that God works through everything is already in Heaven and this is the only resurrection.  There is no other life; man's fulfillment is in this life alone.

Due to persecutions, this sect does not appear to have long survived the death of its founder. Not long after the burning of ten of their members (1210), the sect itself lost its importance, while some of the surviving Amalricians became Brethren of the Free Spirit.

According to Hosea Ballou, then Pierre Batiffol and George T. Knight (1914) Amalric believed that all people would eventually be saved and this was one of the counts upon which he was declared a heretic by Pope Innocent III.

See also
Brethren of the Free Spirit

References

Attribution:
 This cites:
 W. Preger, Geschichte der deutschen Mystik im Mittelalter (Leipzig, 1874, i. 167–173)
 Hauréau, Histoire de la phil. scol. (Paris, 1872)
 C. Schmidt, Histoire de l'Église d'Occident pendant le moyen âge (Paris, 1885)
 Hefele, Conciliengeschichte (2nd ed., Freiburg, 1886)

Sources
 Christoph Ulrich Hahn: Geschichte der Ketzer im Mittelalter, Vol. 3 (Stuttgart, 1850)
 Arno Borst: Religiöse und geistige Bewegungen im Hochmittelalter, Propyläen Weltgeschichte, Ullstein 1963, Vol. 5, p. 537
 Friedrich Heer Medieval World Europe 1100-1350
 Capelle, G. C., Amaury de Bène, étude sur son panthéisme formel (Paris, 1932).
 Russell, J. B., The Influence of Amalric of Bene in Thirteenth Century Pantheism (Berkeley, 1957).

1200s deaths
12th-century births
12th-century Christian universalists
12th-century Christian mystics
Christian universalist theologians
Roman Catholic mystics
Pantheists
Scholastic philosophers